Marty Martin (born August 5, 1951) is a former Democratic member of the Wyoming Senate, representing the 12th district from 2009 until 2013. He previously served in the Wyoming House of Representatives representing the 48th district from 2003 to 2009, including a stint as Minority Leader.

Career
Prior to serving in the state legislature, Martin was a Rock Springs City Councilman. He succeeded retiring City Councilman Rudy Magagna, and served until his resignation in June 1999.

Elections

2002
After incumbent Democratic Representative Bud Nelson announced his retirement, Martin declared his candidacy. He ran unopposed in the Democratic primary and defeated Republican attorney Clark Stith with 55% of the vote.

2004
Martin ran unopposed in both the primary and general elections.

2006
Martin ran unopposed in both the primary and general elections.

2008
After incumbent Democratic Senator Rae Lynn Job announced her retirement, Martin declared his candidacy for the seat. Martin ran unopposed in both the primary and general elections. Job then resigned early and Martin was appointed to fill the remainder of Job's unexpired term, though he was sworn in on the same date as other state legislators.

2012
Martin declined to seek reelection, and was succeeded by Democratic State Representative Bernadine Craft.

References

External links
Wyoming State Legislature - Senator Marty Martin official WY Senate website
Project Vote Smart - Senator Marty Martin (WY) profile
Follow the Money - Marty Martin
2006 2004 2002 campaign contributions

1951 births
Living people
Democratic Party members of the Wyoming House of Representatives
Democratic Party Wyoming state senators